Mike Hewitt (born 14 July 1944 in Dundee), is a Scottish retired football goalkeeper who played professionally in Scotland, Canada and the United States.

After three seasons with the Scottish League's only amateur club, Queen's Park, Hewitt began his professional career with Dundee F.C. in 1970. He won his only representative honour when he was included as an overaged player in the Scotland U23 squad for the unofficial match against West Germany's Olympic XI on 10 January 1972. (He played the full 90 minutes, keeping a clean sheet in Scotland's 1–0 victory.) In 1975, Hewitt became one of the first two players, along with Alex Pringle, signed by the Tampa Bay Rowdies of the North American Soccer League as they purchased his contract from Dundee. He spent the season sharing goalkeeper duties with Paul Hammond as the Rowdies won the league championship. In 1976, the Rowdies traded Hewitt to the San Jose Earthquakes where he manned the nets for the next seven years. While playing outdoor soccer with the Earthquakes, Hewitt also spent the 1979-1980 winter season with the Hartford Hellions of the Major Indoor Soccer League. He also played the 1982-1983 MISL season with the Golden Bay Earthquakes. In mid-April 1983, the Earthquakes sold Hewitt's contract to the Montreal Manic.

References

External links
NASL/MISL stats

1955 births
Living people
Association football goalkeepers
Dundee F.C. players
Golden Bay Earthquakes (MISL) players
Hartford Hellions players
Expatriate soccer players in Canada
Expatriate soccer players in the United States
Major Indoor Soccer League (1978–1992) players
Montreal Manic players
North American Soccer League (1968–1984) players
North American Soccer League (1968–1984) indoor players
San Jose Earthquakes (1974–1988) players
Scottish expatriate footballers
Scottish footballers
Tampa Bay Rowdies (1975–1993) players
Scotland amateur international footballers
Scottish expatriate sportspeople in the United States
Scottish expatriate sportspeople in Canada